In Greek mythology, Molpadia (Ancient Greek: Μολπαδία means 'divine song') may refer to the two different women:

 Molpadia, an Amazon who was said to have fought for both Antiope and Orithyia. She was a participant in the Attic War, where she witnessed her queen Antiope sustain heavy injuries. Antiope was hurt so seriously that she could not defend herself from Theseus and his retainers. Knowing this, Molpadia killed the queen with an arrow (some say spear), saving her from violation by the Athenian king. Other sources, however, state that she killed Antiope by accident. She was afterwards killed by Theseus, and her tomb was shown at Athens. Like many other Amazons, she may have been named for a goddess, in this case a psychopomp deity. Her name means "Death Song".
 Molpadia, daughter of Staphylus and Chrysothemis, sister of Parthenos and Rhoeo, alternatively called Hemithea.

Cultural depictions
Molpadia is a supporting character in Evangeline Walton's 1983 historical fiction novel The Sword is Forged, which chronicles the story of Antiope and Theseus.

Notes

References 

 Diodorus Siculus, The Library of History translated by Charles Henry Oldfather. Twelve volumes. Loeb Classical Library. Cambridge, Massachusetts: Harvard University Press; London: William Heinemann, Ltd. 1989. Vol. 3. Books 4.59–8. Online version at Bill Thayer's Web Site
 Diodorus Siculus, Bibliotheca Historica. Vol 1-2. Immanel Bekker. Ludwig Dindorf. Friedrich Vogel. in aedibus B. G. Teubneri. Leipzig. 1888-1890. Greek text available at the Perseus Digital Library.
 Lucius Mestrius Plutarchus, Lives with an English Translation by Bernadotte Perrin. Cambridge, MA. Harvard University Press. London. William Heinemann Ltd. 1914. 1. Online version at the Perseus Digital Library. Greek text available from the same website.
 Pausanias, Description of Greece with an English Translation by W.H.S. Jones, Litt.D., and H.A. Ormerod, M.A., in 4 Volumes. Cambridge, MA, Harvard University Press; London, William Heinemann Ltd. 1918. . Online version at the Perseus Digital Library
 Pausanias, Graeciae Descriptio. 3 vols. Leipzig, Teubner. 1903.  Greek text available at the Perseus Digital Library.

Amazons (Greek mythology)
Attic mythology